Luis Gimeno (15 February 1927 – 24 July 2017) was an Uruguayan-born Mexican actor. In 2010, he received the TVyNovelas Award for Best Leading Actor. Gimeno was born in Montevideo and died in Mexico City, aged 90. He was survived by his wife, Virginia Gutiérrez, an actress.

Selected filmography
Ha llegado un extraño (1959)
Don Bosco (1961)
La madrastra (1962)
Cristina Guzmán (1966)
La dueña (1966)
Leyendas de México (1968)
De la tierra a la luna (1969)
Alcanzar una estrella II (1991)
María Mercedes (1992)
La antorcha encendida (1996)
Rencor apasionado (1998)
DKDA: Sueños de juventud (1999)
Amarte es mi Pecado (2004)
Barrera de amor (2005)
Pablo y Andrea (2005)
Mañana es para siempre (2008)
Hasta que el dinero nos separe (2009)

References

External links

1927 births
2017 deaths
Male actors from Montevideo
Uruguayan emigrants to Mexico
Mexican male telenovela actors